Rein Aun (5 October 1940 – 11 March 1995) was a multitalented Estonian athlete. He competed for the Soviet Union in the decathlon at the 1964 and 1968 Olympics, winning a silver medal in 1964.

Aun was born in a family of five brothers and one sister. Their father died when Aun was just 13. He attended a sports school, where he trained in long-distance running before changing to decathlon. His 1964 Olympic medal was his only international success. Domestically, he held the Soviet decathlon titles in 1967–68 and finished second in 1964. In his native Estonia he was a multiple champion in various athletics events and even in volleyball in 1958. In retirement he coached athletics and served as the secretary-general of the Estonian Athletics Association.

References

1940 births
1995 deaths
Estonian decathletes
Estonian pentathletes
Athletes (track and field) at the 1964 Summer Olympics
Athletes (track and field) at the 1968 Summer Olympics
Olympic athletes of the Soviet Union
Olympic silver medalists for the Soviet Union
Athletes from Tallinn
Soviet decathletes
Medalists at the 1964 Summer Olympics
Olympic silver medalists in athletics (track and field)
Burials at Liiva Cemetery